The Herald Formation is a stratigraphical unit of Late Ordovician age in the Western Canadian Sedimentary Basin. 

It was defined in well Imperial Herald 1-31-1-20W2M by the Lower Paleozoic Names and Correlations Committee of the Saskatchewan Geological Society in 1958.

Lithology 
The Herald Formation is composed of dolomitic limestone and dolomite, which can be microcrystalline, argillaceous or microlaminated.
 
In the centre of the basin, it is represented by anhydrite.

Distribution 

Relationship to other units 
The Herald Formation is disconformably overlain by the Stony Mountain Formation and conformably overlays the Yeoman Formation.

It can be correlated with the Fort Garry Member of the Red River Formation in Manitoba and in the Williston Basin.

Subdivisions 
In south-eastern Saskatchewan, the formation is divided in three units, corresponding to three sedimentation cycles:
 Lake Alma Member
 Coronach Member
 Redvers Unit

References 

Geologic formations of Saskatchewan
Ordovician Saskatchewan
Western Canadian Sedimentary Basin